The Xiangjiang New Area  is a new area at state level in Changsha City, Hunan Province, China. The new area was created on 8 April 2015, it is the 12th state-level new area approved to establish by the State Council. Xiangjiang New Area is located in the west of the Xiang River and covers parts of Yuelu, Wangcheng and Ningxiang. The Hunan CPC Party Secretary Xu Shousheng and Hunan Governor Du Jiahao attended the opening ceremony of the new area held in Changsha, 24 May 2015.

Geography

Core zone
The core zone of Xiangjiang New Area consists of most of Yuelu District, the total area on the south of the Wei River and the west of the Xiang River of Wangcheng District, Jinzhou Town of Ningxiang County.

 17 subdistricts of Yuelu Districts: Dongfanghong, Guanshaling, Hanpu, Juzizhou, Lugu, Meixihu, Pingtang, Tianding, Wangchengpo, Wangyuehu, Wangyue, Xihu, Xianjiahu, Xueshi, Yanghu, Yinpenling and Yuelu subdistricts. of which Lugu Subdistrict is entrusted to manage by Changsha High-Tech Industrial Development Zone (CSHTZ).
 9 subdistricts and towns of Wangcheng District: Bairuopu, Baishazhou, Dazehu, Gaotangling, Huangjinyuan, Jinshanqiao, Leifeng, Wushan and Yueliangdao 9 subdistricts and towns. of which Leifeng Subdistrict is entrusted to manage by CSHTZ.
Jinzhou Town of Ningxiang County. Jinzhou is home of Ningxiang High-tech Industrial Park.

References

New areas (China)
Economy of Changsha
2015 establishments in China